The Critics' Choice Documentary Award for Best Documentary Feature is one of the awards presented annually by Critics Choice Association since the awards debuted in 2016. In 2022, the top three documentaries of the year are honored, with gold, silver, and bronze awards in the category.

Winners and nominees

2010s

2020s

See also
 Academy Award for Best Documentary Feature
 BAFTA Award for Best Documentary
 Critics' Choice Movie Award for Best Documentary Feature
 Golden Globe Award for Best Documentary Film
 Independent Spirit Award for Best Documentary Feature

References

External links
Official website

Critics' Choice Documentary Award
Best Documentary Feature
Awards established in 2016